André Delelis (23 May 1924 – 4 September 2012). was a French politician. He served as the Minister of Commerce and Craft Industry from 1981 to 1984, under President François Mitterrand.

Biography
Delelis was born on 23 May 1924 in Cauchy-à-la-Tour, France. He was a Socialist member of the National Assembly of France from 14 June 1981 to 24 July 1981. He was a member of the French Senate from 1983 to 1992. From 1966 to 1998, he was the Mayor of Lens.

References

1924 births
2012 deaths
People from Pas-de-Calais
French Section of the Workers' International politicians
Socialist Party (France) politicians
French Ministers of Commerce and Industry
Deputies of the 3rd National Assembly of the French Fifth Republic
Deputies of the 4th National Assembly of the French Fifth Republic
Deputies of the 5th National Assembly of the French Fifth Republic
Deputies of the 6th National Assembly of the French Fifth Republic
Deputies of the 7th National Assembly of the French Fifth Republic
French Senators of the Fifth Republic
Senators of Pas-de-Calais
Mayors of places in Hauts-de-France